Laelia albida is the most northerly-growing laelia in Mexico.  This epiphytic orchid bears ten or more small (5 cm) pale pink flowers on a half-meter terminal inflorescence in late winter to early spring.  It is cold-tolerant close to freezing in the winter and needs to be kept dry until new vegetative growth is seen in late spring.  It seems to do much better mounted on cork or hardwood than potted.

The diploid chromosome number of L. albida has been determined as 2n = 42 and as 2n = ~63.

References

External links

 Photos (Laelia Albida)

Orchids of Mexico
Epiphytic orchids
albida